Thomas Winer Malone (November 1, 1929 – January 22, 2018) was a Bahamian wooden boat builder who single-handedly crafted over 200 dinghies in his lifetime. Ranging , his boats were hewn from memory without the use of power tools, jigs, or templates. Malone used wood from trees he cut himself on the Abaco Islands.
 
Malone's Abaco dinghy is open-hulled and single-masted with a small "banana board" supporting the top of the sail.
 
Before the advent of outboard motors in the 1950s, Bahamian dinghies often provided the sole means of transportation for fishermen, farmers, and visiting families, as well as the occasional smuggler (or rum runner). If the wind died, a boat could be propelled with a single, long sculling oar off the transom. When fiberglass hulls finally supplanted wood construction in the 1960s, Malone's Abaco dinghies remained in strong demand, primarily from American sailing enthusiasts.

Notes

Additional references 
 

1929 births
2018 deaths
Boat builders
People from Hope Town